Kalumba, also known as Sendwe Mwlaba, is the supreme god figure worshipped by the Luba people of the Democratic Republic of Congo.

Legend 
According to the creation myth of the Luba religion, in the beginning, Kalumba created the first man and woman to explore the earth. They informed Kalumba on their return, that the earth is dark and only the moon existed. So, Kalumba created the sun. From that day on, the first man and woman started living on earth.

In another myth, humans started living on earth when Kalumba banished them from the heavens when they start fighting one another. They suffered on earth and wanted to return to heaven, so they started building a tower that could reach the heavens. Several people managed to return and tried to inform the others on earth of their success by playing musical instruments. The sound notified Kalumba of what happened and thus he destroyed the tower.

In the origin-of-death myth, Kalumba tried to stop the personification of Death from encountering humans by placing a dog and a goat to guard the paths leading to earth. The guards were supposed to only let the personification of Life pass so that humans can live forever, but both of them failed to do so. The dog, who was on the first watch, fell asleep and let Death in, while the goat who was in charge the next day, stopped Life instead.

See also 

 List of African mythological figures

References 

African gods
African mythology
Creator gods